Geminisphaera is a genus of bacteria from the family of Opitutaceae with one known species Geminisphaera colitermitum.

References

Verrucomicrobiota
Bacteria genera
Monotypic bacteria genera
Taxa described in 2018